Lachnaia puncticollis is a species of leaf beetles from the subfamily Cryptocephalinae that can be found in Algeria, Morocco, on the Iberian Peninsula and in southern France.

References

Clytrini
Beetles described in 1840
Taxa named by Louis Alexandre Auguste Chevrolat